The yellow baboon (Papio cynocephalus) is a baboon in the family of Old World monkeys. The species epithet means "dog-head" in Greek, due to the dog-like shape of the muzzle and head. Yellow baboons have slim bodies with long arms and legs, and yellowish-brown hair. They resemble the Chacma baboon, but are somewhat smaller and with a less elongated muzzle. Their hairless faces are black, framed with white sideburns. Males can grow to about 84 cm, females to about 60 cm. They have long tails which grow to be nearly as long as their bodies. The average life span of the yellow baboon in the wild is roughly 15–20 years; some may live up to 30 years.

Yellow baboons inhabit savannas and light forests in eastern Africa, from Kenya and Tanzania to Zimbabwe and Botswana. They are diurnal, terrestrial, and live in complex, mixed-gender social groups of 8 to 200 individuals per troop. Like all other baboon species, they are omnivorous, with a preference for fruits; they also eat plants, leaves, seeds, grasses, bulbs, bark, blossoms and fungi, as well as worms, grubs, insects, spiders, scorpions, birds, rodents and small mammals. All species of baboons are highly opportunistic feeders and will eat virtually any food they can find.

Yellow baboons use at least ten different vocalizations to communicate. When traveling as a group, males will lead, females and young stay safely in the middle, and less-dominant males bring up the rear. A baboon group's hierarchy is a serious matter, and some subspecies have developed behaviors intended to avoid confrontation and retaliation. For example, males may use infants as a kind of "passport" or shield for safe approach toward another male. One male will pick up the infant and hold it up as it nears the other male. This action often calms the other male and allows the first male to approach safely. 
 
Baboons fulfill several functions in their ecosystem, not only serving as food for larger predators, but also dispersing seeds in their waste and through their messy foraging habits. They are also efficient predators of smaller animals and their young.

Baboons have been able to fill a variety of ecological niches, including places inhospitable to other animals, such as regions taken over by human settlement. Thus, they are one of the most successful African primates and are not listed as threatened or endangered. However, the same behavioral adaptations that make them so successful also cause them to be considered pests by humans in many areas. Raids on farmers' crops and livestock and other such intrusions into human settlements have made most baboons species subject to many organized extermination projects. However, continued habitat loss forces more and more baboons to migrate toward areas of human settlement.

The three subspecies of the yellow baboon are:
 Papio cynocephalus cynocephalus (typical yellow baboon)
 Papio cynocephalus ibeanus (Ibean baboon)
 Papio cynocephalus kindae (Kinda baboon)

Gallery

References

External links

Primate Info Net Papio cynocephalus Factsheet
Animal Bytes

yellow baboon
Mammals of Ethiopia
Mammals of Kenya
Mammals of Mozambique
Mammals of Somalia
Fauna of Central Africa
Fauna of East Africa
yellow baboon
yellow baboon